Sofie Svava (born 11 August 2000) is a Danish professional footballer who plays for Real Madrid and the Denmark national team. She previously played for FC Rosengård of the Swedish Damallsvenskan and for Brøndby IF of the Danish Elitedivisionen. She is a left-sided defender or midfielder.

In January 2020, she was named by UEFA as one of the 10 most promising young players in Europe

Career
From 2017 to 2019, Svava played for Brøndby IF in the Danish top flight. In July 2019, it was announced that Svava had signed a two-and-a-half-year contract with the Swedish side FC Rosengård. It was reported that Brøndby had received a club-record fee for 17-year-old Svava. In her debut season, she won Damallsvenskan.

In November 2020, it was announced that Svava had signed a three-year contract with German club VfL Wolfsburg, running from January 2021.

Club career
Svava debuted for the Danish national team during a friendly against Finland in January 2019. She has appeared for the team during the UEFA Women's Euro 2021 qualifying cycle.

In 2019, Svava was named Danish Breakthrough Player of the Year. Additionally, she was also nominated for Danish Football Player of the Year.

International goals

References

External links
 
 
 
 Sofie Svava at Danish Football Association (DBU) 

2000 births
Living people
People from Gentofte Municipality
Danish women's footballers
Women's association football midfielders
Damallsvenskan players
Brøndby IF (women) players
FC Rosengård players
Expatriate women's footballers in Sweden
Denmark women's international footballers
Danish expatriate women's footballers
Danish expatriate sportspeople in Germany
Expatriate women's footballers in Germany
Danish expatriate sportspeople in Spain
VfL Wolfsburg (women) players
UEFA Women's Euro 2022 players
Frauen-Bundesliga players
Sportspeople from the Capital Region of Denmark
Danish expatriate sportspeople in Sweden
Expatriate women's footballers in Spain
Primera División (women) players
Real Madrid Femenino players

Association football midfielders
Denmark international footballers
Expatriate footballers in Germany